Jakuzi is a Turkish synthpop band, formed in Istanbul in 2015. The band consists of Kutay Soyocak, Can Kalyoncu, Meriç Erseçgen and Ahmetcan Gökçeer. Kutay Soyocak and Taner Yücel formed the project to move away from their previous punk-oriented music projects. The duo rose to prominence in Istanbul's underground music scene after the release of their debut album Fantezi Müzik. Originally released in 2016 through Domuz Records, it was reissued by City Slang on 24 March 2017.

The band's sound has been described as synthpop, dark wave and new wave. Jakuzi is influenced by Turkish pop music, as well as genres ranging from krautrock, disco and post-punk.

Band members
Kutay Soyocak - vocals (2015–present)
Can Kalyoncu - drums (2016–present)
Meriç Erseçgen - bass guitar (2017–present)
Ahmetcan Gökçeer - guitar, synths (2018–present)

Former members
Taner Yücel - bass guitar, synths, sampler (2015–2017)

Discography
 Fantezi Müzik (2016)
 Hata Payı (2019)

References

External links
 

Musical groups established in 2015
Turkish pop music groups
Turkish rock music groups
Turkish synthpop groups
New wave groups
Dark wave musical groups
Musical groups from Istanbul
City Slang artists
2015 establishments in Turkey